Daemyeong Station is a railway station in Nam-gu, Daegu, South Korea, on Daegu Metro Line 1.

Number of passengers per year

References

External links

 Cyber station information from Daegu Metropolitan Transit Corporation

Nam District, Daegu
Railway stations opened in 1997
Daegu Metro stations